Antalis diarrhox is a species of tusk shell, a marine scaphopod mollusk in the family Dentaliidae.

This species is endemic to New Zealand waters.  It is found north east of East Cape at about 1,300 m, on the Chatham Rise at about 220 m, and in the Tasman Sea at about 610 m.

References

 Spencer, H.G., Marshall, B.A. & Willan, R.C. (2009). Checklist of New Zealand living Mollusca. Pp 196-219. in: Gordon, D.P. (ed.) New Zealand inventory of biodiversity. Volume one. Kingdom Animalia: Radiata, Lophotrochozoa, Deuterostomia. Canterbury University Press, Christchurch.

External links
 Watson, R.B. (1879). Mollusca of H.M.S. 'Challenger' Expedition. II. The Solenoconchia, comprising the genera Dentalium, Siphodentalium, and Cadulus. Journal of the Linnean Society (London). 14: 508-529

Scaphopods
Molluscs described in 1879